Vourate Geitonoi (Greek: Βουράτε Γειτόνοι) is a Cypriot comedy series broadcast by Sigma TV from 2001 to 2005.

Due to its massive popularity the series aired for one more season in 2010.

Plot
The series evolves around the lives of the residents of a Nicosia apartment building.

Characters
The owner of the building, Rikkos Mapouros is known for his stinginess. This is shown on many occasions. For example, in the last season of the series Rikkos son requested a mobile phone for his birthday. Rikkos, reluctant to spend unnecessary money he attaches two cups together with a wire and gives them to his son. He suffered a stroke when he was asked to pay taxes, something he had been somehow avoiding for years.

Rikkos wife, Pepa is known to have the most common sense from all the characters. She often gets in fights with Rikos and chases him with a wooden rolling pin.

Rikko's and Pepa's oldest child, Kikitsa is known for being spoilt although Rikkos never buys her anything. By the end of the series she is married.

Nastazia, Rikko's and Pepa's neighbor that lives on the floor above them is known for her dislike of the Greek Cypriot dialect and recoils whenever Rikkos is hitting on her due to the fact that Rikkos is very traditional. She also gets married by the end of the series.

Artemakis, Nastazia's neighbor is known for frequently exclaiming (Greek:Εγώ ενζε), a Greek Cypriot way of saying your innocent.

There are many other residents of the building although not as significant as these

Greek television series
Television in Cyprus
Cypriot television series
2001 Greek television series debuts
2005 Greek television series endings
2001 Cypriot television series debuts
2005 Cypriot television series endings
2000s Cypriot television series
Sigma TV original programming